Doki (also known as Doki Adventures) is a Canadian animated children's television series for Discovery Kids that premiered on the channel in Latin America on April 15, 2013. The series is produced by Portfolio Entertainment.

The series is about a six-year-old dog named Doki and his five friends; Mundi, Oto, Anabella, Gabi, and Fico, who are members of the Worldwide Expedition Club, a travel group. On May 12, 2016, the series was renewed for a third season, which premiered on March 4, 2017, and a fourth season, that was actually cancelled.

Characters

Main

 Doki (voiced by Griffin Hook in seasons 1–3, William Romain in season 3) is a six-year-old dalmatian dog, whose love of gaming makes crazy situations no problem for him. Doki is always open to suggestions and tips from his friends. He learns from his mistakes and applies his knowledge to his adventures. He wears a green cap.
 Mundi (voiced by Tara Emo) is a ladybug, who is also an expert mechanic. She is very cute and always helps others when needed.
 Oto (voiced by Caden Hughes in seasons 1–2, Collin Dean in season 3) is an anteater, and the cute captain, conductor, or driver of any vehicle or transport method that the group of explorers use in their adventures. His confidence doesn't always fit with their skills and perfect landings. Oto loves to change clothes, costume or hat and almost always travels with his friend Mundi. Mundi can fix what he breaks.
 Anabella (voiced by Katie Grant) is a hot pink flamingo, and the doctor, loving little sister of the group. Always happy and loving, she tends to daydream and can easily get distracted by anything beautiful or unusual. She is deeply sensitive, and she often expresses how she feels by dancing. Anabella has a free spirit, and is open and adventurous.
 Gabi (voiced by Sarah Sheppard) is a bright, energetic, and precocious goat who is the most adult of the group and often uses complex words that the team doesn't always understand. She has a great sense of humor and is brave, loyal, stubborn when necessary, and very competitive. Despite her obvious maturity, Gabi hides a weakness; a tendency to believe that she is the smartest of the group, appearing insensitive to the feelings of others and her great heart the salvation of all complicated situations. She has a pet worm named Lancelot.
 Fico (voiced by Lucas Kalechstein in seasons 1–3, Roman Lutterotti in season 3) is a blue otter, and the funny one of the group who is always happy and known for being silly, affectionate, and impulsive. He's like a whirlwind, impetuous and energetic, to the point of almost being hyperactive. However, he gets confused and easily distracted sometimes, and this situation usually leads to awkward and difficult situations that he struggles to face. He loves risky activities, water sports, and speed.

Episodes

Production
Doki was originally the Discovery Kids mascot in Latin America in 2005. JBMW Media eventually developed Doki as a full series, and Portfolio Entertainment produced and distributed the series. PiP Animation Services provided animation for seasons 1 and 2 and Portfolio Animation provided animation for season 3.

Broadcast
Doki premiered on Discovery Familia in the United States on November 11, 2013. The English version later premiered on Qubo on September 1, 2014 until it ceased on February 28, 2021. and ION Television's Qubo Kids Corner block on January 4, 2015. The show also aired on Smile from 2015 to 2020. The "Doki Rocks Rio" episode aired on Discovery Family on August 5, 2016 and August 7, 2016. In Asia, the series premiered on Discovery Kids Asia on February 15, 2016, and Discovery Family in Africa on April 1, 2016. In Canada, the show airs on Knowledge Network, TVOKids and Toon-A-Vision. In Australia, the show aired on Discovery Kids. In Iran, the show aired on IRIB TV2. In the United Arab Emirates the show was aired on Nat Geo Kids Abu Dhabi since November 20, 2017.

References

External links

 at Portfolio Entertainment
 on Discovery Kids (Latin America)
 on Discovery Kids (Brazil)
 on Discovery Familia
 on Knowledge Kids
 on TVOKids

2010s Canadian animated television series
2013 Canadian television series debuts
2019 Canadian television series endings
Canadian children's animated adventure television series
Canadian children's animated comedy television series
Canadian children's animated fantasy television series
Canadian preschool education television series
Animated preschool education television series
2010s preschool education television series
TVO original programming
Animated television series about children
Animated television series about dogs
English-language television shows